Dimecoenia spinosa is a species of shore flies in the family Ephydridae.

Distribution
Canada, Mexico, United States, West Indies.

References

Ephydridae
Taxa named by Hermann Loew
Diptera of North America
Insects described in 1864